Gangahoni is a village in Biaora tehsil in Rajgarh district in the state of Madhya Pradesh, India.

Geography
Gangahoni is situated along the Suthaliya-Narsinghgarh State Highway, 25 km from Narsinghgarh, 20 km from Suthaliya, 35 km from Biaora, and 100 km from the state capital, Bhopal.

Demographics
Gangahoni is a large village with a total of 639 families residing within it. The village has a population of 2,755 of which 1,418 are males while 1,337 are females as per the 2011 census. The population of children with age 0-6 is 452 which makes up 16.41% of total population of the village. Gangahoni village has a lower literacy rate compared to Madhya Pradesh. In 2011, the literacy rate of Gangahoni village was 54.58% compared to 69.32% of Madhya Pradesh. In Gangahoni, male literacy stands at 71.76% while female literacy rate was 36.78%.

Languages
The primary languages spoken in Gangahoni are Hindi and Malvi.

References

External links

Rajgarh, Madhya Pradesh